Acuity Insurance is a mutual insurance company headquartered in Sheboygan, Wisconsin.

Overview 
Acuity Insurance is the 56th-largest insurer in the United States.

They do not sell insurance directly, instead relying on independent agents.

The company operates in 29 states, generates over $1.5 billion in revenue through more than 1,000 independent agencies, manages over $5.5 billion in assets, and employs approximately 1,500 people. Acuity Insurance is rated A+ (Superior) by A.M. Best and also receives an A+ rating from Standard and Poor's. In 2021, Acuity was named on Forbes America’s Best Midsize Employers list, as well as being ranked by Forbes as the best employer in Wisconsin.

History

Early Years 
In 1925, a group of farmers and small town business men from Sheboygan County came together to form the Mutual Auto Insurance Company of the Town of Herman.  The formation of the company came at a time when direct writers, mutual companies that sold insurance to farmers and others in specific agricultural businesses, as well as ownership of personal automobiles, were on the rise.  The next year, in 1926, William J. Prietzel became the first president and CEO of Mutual Auto Insurance, and would remain in this position for 33 years.

The 1950's would end up being a decade of many changes for the company.  First, the company changed its name to Mutual Auto of Wisconsin in 1953.  This name would only last for 4 years, as the company was renamed to Heritage Mutual Insurance Company in 1957.

The Marvin Hessler Era 
In 1959, Marvin C. Hessler was named the president and CEO of Heritage Mutual, after the sudden death of Prietzel.  Hessler was the treasurer of Heritage at the time, as well as another longtime member of the company with over 25 years of involvement at the time he took up the mantle of leadership.

Hessler most notably played an important role in the company's negotiations with the Citizens Bank of Sheboygan to purchase their new corporate office.  In 1960, the company finished its move to Sheboygan.

The John Holden Era 
In 1969, Wisconsin attorney John R. Holden became the president and CEO of Heritage Mutual.  Holden was instrumental in moving Heritage's headquarters to Sheboygan's southwest side along Interstate 43, where it sits today. At the time of the company's initial move in 1979, he was quoted in The Sheboygan Press saying, "Ninety-nine percent of the people passing Sheboygan will never see the downtown, but will view it from I-43. We think what they should see is our company building and grounds … and I think it will be a favorable recollection." Heritage Mutual completed its move to its current location in 1984.

Holden served as President and CEO from 1969 to 1999. During this time, the company's written premium grew from just over $7 million to $249 million. Under his leadership, much of the groundwork for the company's later growth and expansion were set.

The Ben Salzmann Era 
In August 1999, Holden stepped down from the presidency.  Ben Salzmann, the current Vice President of Technology at the time, became the new president and CEO.  The company would change its name to Acuity Insurance in 2001.

The company opened a $39 million addition to its headquarters in 2004. The addition added 262,000 square feet (24,300 m2) to the facility and renovated about 20,000 square feet (2,000 m2) of space.

In 2022, Acuity was named to Forbes’s Best Midsize Employers list. The company was ranked at #26 out of 500 companies on the list, a more than 400-point jump for the insurer over 2021.

COVID-19 
In 2020, the Covid-19 crisis hit the United States.  When the nationwide Stay-at-Home order was given in March 2020, Acuity remained open and operational.  This was thanks in due part to the company's approach on remote work technology and procedures, as well as flex hour options for employees.  Throughout 2020 and 2021, Acuity would operate on a work-from-home basis, providing their employees with necessary equipment, gift cards, and other presents.

Acuity received universal praise for their handling of the Covid-19 crisis, with Ben Salzmann being ranked as the 8th Best CEO in the United States during the pandemic.  Employees would also rank Acuity as the best company for work-life balance during Covid-19.

Flagpoles 
Acuity Insurance raised the tallest flagpole in the United States on July 2, 2005.

This flag and flagpole outdid an earlier Acuity record, a flag raised June 2, 2003, atop a  flagpole. The new flagpole was a replacement; the old pole toppled over due to stress and high winds, falling away from nearby Interstate 43. The new flagpole was designed with extra bracing and placed much farther from the highway. On October 4, 2007 it was announced that the flag pole would yet again be rebuilt to allow access to the beacon marker on top in case of light bulb replacement. The flag was rebuilt and the top section finished on April 4, 2008. On April 7, 2008 the pole, without a flag yet flying, began swaying noticeably during relatively low wind speeds. On April 8, 2008 the ball and top section were again removed, followed by a full removal of the pole.

In April 2014, Acuity Insurance announced another attempt at the nation's largest flagpole to be erected by that year's Fourth of July, this time with a  pole built in Manitowoc, WI by wind turbine manufacturer Broadwind Energy. A  by  flag was raised for the first time on May 22, 2014.

The new flag at Acuity Insurance, covering nearly 10,000 square feet, features stripes that are over 5 feet high and stars that are nearly 3 feet across. Weighing 340 pounds dry, the nylon flag requires 72 cubic feet of storage space when not being flown. The flag is the world's largest free-flying American flag.

On June 2, 2020, the flag was severely damaged during a heavy storm.  Several red and white stripes were torn away.

Gallery

References

External links
Official website
Dun & Bradstreet Overview

Financial services companies established in 1925
Companies based in Wisconsin
Insurance companies of the United States
Buildings and structures in Sheboygan, Wisconsin
1925 establishments in Wisconsin
Mutual insurance companies of the United States
American companies established in 1925